Marija Vecrumba (1885-1919), was a Latvian physician.

She studied medicine at the University of Bern.

She became the first female physician in Latvia in 1911. She was active in Jelgava. When the German troops occupied Jelgava in March 1919, she was arrested and shot when nursing injured soldiers.

References

1885 births
1919 deaths
Latvian physicians